The 1990 Miami Hurricanes football team represented the University of Miami during the 1990 NCAA Division I-A football season. It was the Hurricanes' 65th season of football. The Hurricanes were led by second-year head coach Dennis Erickson and played their home games at the Orange Bowl. Coming off the school's third National Championship in six years in 1989, Miami came in to the 1990 season favored by most experts to repeat as National Champions. However, a season opening loss to BYU and a later defeat by Notre Dame dashed those chances and the Canes finished the season 10–2 overall. They were invited to the Cotton Bowl where they defeated Texas, 46–3.

Schedule

Personnel

Rankings

Season summary

BYU

California

Iowa

Florida State

Kansas

Notre Dame

Texas Tech

Pittsburgh

Boston College

Syracuse

San Diego State

Cotton Bowl

Awards and honors
Craig Erickson, Johnny Unitas Golden Arm Award
Russell Maryland, Outland Trophy

Jack Harding University of Miami MVP Award
Russell Maryland, DT

1991 NFL Draft

References

Miami
Miami Hurricanes football seasons
Cotton Bowl Classic champion seasons
Miami Hurricanes football